The Girl in White is a 1952 American drama film directed by John Sturges and starring June Allyson, Arthur Kennedy and Mildred Dunnock. It is based on the memoirs of the pioneering female surgeon Emily Dunning Barringer.

Plot

Her pregnant mother is in labor and in dire need of a doctor, but young Emily Dunning is new to the neighborhood and knows no one. When someone finally suggests a Dr. Yeomans, she is shocked to discover the doctor is a woman. It is the turn of the century in New York and times are changing, but as yet women are not being made welcome in the field of medicine. Emily is so impressed by Marie Yeomans that she decides to enroll in med school at Cornell.

Fellow student Ben Barringer is one of the few there who encourage Emily, and they also fall in love. Ben plans to continue his education at Harvard, but upsets Emily by asking her to abandon her studies and accompany him. Emily instead moves to New York, where she and Dr. Yeomans share an apartment. Hospitals deny her an internship until a reluctant Dr. Seth Pawling is persuaded to accept her, although he confines her mainly to ambulance duty. Ben, it turns out, has become an intern at the same hospital.

A patient is pronounced dead prematurely by a Dr. Graham, but is resuscitated by Emily, who exhausts herself for hours in the process. A nurse informs the press of Emily's heroic act, irritating Graham but impressing Pawling, who recognizes her determination and skills. When a typhoid epidemic breaks out, the need for doctors is so great that Dr. Yeomans is asked to help. She, too, earns the respect of the hospital's men, just before her weak heart gives out. Ben is leaving for Paris to continue his work, but Emily heeds her friend's advice to have a personal life as well as a professional one, so she promises Ben that their careers will not keep them apart.

Cast
 June Allyson as Emily Dunning
 Arthur Kennedy as Ben Barringer
 Mildred Dunnock as Marie Yeomans
 Gary Merrill as Seth Pawling
 Jesse White as 	Alec, Ambulance Driver
 Marilyn Erskine as 	Nurse Jane Doe
 Herbert Anderson as 	Dr. Barclay 
 Gar Moore as 	Dr. Graham
 Don Keefer as 	Dr. Williams
 Ann Tyrrell a s	Nurse Bigley
 James Arness as 	Matt
 Curtis Cooksey as 	Commissioner of Hospitals Hawley
 Carol Brannon as 	Nurse Wells
 Ann Morrison as Nurse Schiff
 Jo Gilbert as 	Nurse Bleeker
 Erwin Kalser as 	Dr. Schneider
 Kathryn Card as 	Mrs. Lindsay
 Jonathan Cott as Dr. Ellerton
 Joan Valerie as 	Nurse Hanson
 Coleman Francis as Orderly
 A. Cameron Grant as 	Elevator Attendant
 David Fresco as 	Patient

Reception
According to MGM records the film earned $904,000 in the US and Canada and $440,000 elsewhere resulting in a loss of $292,000.

Radio adaptation
The Girl in White was presented on Lux Radio Theatre May 18, 1953. The one-hour adaptation starred Allyson and Steve Forrest.

References

External links
 
  
 

1952 films
Films directed by John Sturges
Films scored by David Raksin
1952 drama films
Metro-Goldwyn-Mayer films
American drama films
American black-and-white films
1950s English-language films
1950s American films